Helen Ward may refer to:

Helen Ward (footballer) (born 1986), Welsh footballer
Helen Ward (scientist), British professor of public health
Helen Ward (singer) (1913–1998), American jazz singer